Cat's Cradle is the 6th novel in the Cat Royal series by Julia Golding and was published in 2009.

It is a young adult historical novel that continues to follow Cat on her adventures after being abandoned as a baby on the doorstep of Drury Lane.

Plot summary
In this book, Cat's guardian shows her a letter from someone claiming to be her mother so Cat travels to the Scottish town Lanark to find her family. She begins working in a cotton mill to get to know her family before revealing who she is however she ends up being kidnapped and has to rely on her friends to find her.

References 

2009 British novels
2009 children's books
Children's historical novels
British children's novels
Novels set in Scotland
Novels by Julia Golding
Egmont Books books
Lanark